The Great Interior Design Challenge is a British television interior design competition broadcast on BBC Two from 20 January 2014 to 19 January 2017. Each series aims to find "Britain's best amateur interior designers". All programmes in the first three series have been presented by Tom Dyckhoff with the design tasks judged by Daniel Hopwood and Sophie Robinson. Interior designer Kelly Hoppen replaced Robinson as lead judge in series four, with Robinson becoming a guest judge along with Michelle Ogundehin, Elle Magazine's Decoration UK editor-in-chief. Each episode introduces a new location with distinctive architecture and focuses on a few participants at a time. Contestants have a main challenge – usually to make-over a room in the home of their allocated client – and an additional small task – such as the upcycling of an old item.

Production
The commissioning of the series was announced by Tanya Shaw and Alison Kirkham  and the executive producers are Tanya Shaw for the BBC and Alannah Richardson for Studio Lambert.

The presenter Tom Dyckhoff is a design critic of The Times. In the first three series, experienced interior designers Daniel Hopwood and Sophie Robinson judge and give expert opinions. Interior designer Kelly Hoppen replaced Robinson as lead judge in series four.

Episode list

Series One

Series Two

Series Three

Series Four

See also
The Apartment (TV series)
Changing Rooms

References

External links
 
 

2014 British television series debuts
2017 British television series endings
Television shows set in the United Kingdom
BBC television documentaries
English-language television shows